In modern usage, retard is a pejorative term either for someone with a mental disability or for someone who is considered stupid, slow to understand, or ineffective in some way. The adjective retarded is in the same way used for something very foolish or stupid. Because it is now considered offensive, the word is commonly referred to by the euphemisms "r-word" and "r-slur".

It was previously used as a medical term. The verb "to retard" means to delay or hold back, and so "retard" became known as a medical term in the late 19th and early 20th centuries to describe children with intellectual disabilities, or retarded mental development. Until the 1960s, the terms moron, idiot, cretin, and imbecile were all genuine, non-offensive terms to refer to people with mental intellectual disabilities and low intelligence. These words were discontinued in that form when concerns arose that they had developed negative meanings, with "retard" and "retarded" replacing them. After that, the terms "handicapped" (United States) and "disabled" (United Kingdom) replaced "retard" and "retarded". Disabled is now considered a more polite term than handicapped in the United States as well.

Etymology 
The word retard dates as far back as 1426. It stems from the Latin verb retardare, meaning 'to hinder' or 'make slow'. The English language, along with other European ones, adopted the word and used it as similar meaning, slow and delayed. In English, the word "to decelerate" would become a more common term than "to retard", while in others like French or Catalan, retard is still in common usage to mean 'delay' (tard).

Modern use 
Retard has transitioned from an impartial term to one that is negatively loaded. For this reason, the term is now widely considered as degrading even when used in its original context.

Much like today's socially acceptable terms idiot and moron, which are also defined as some sort of mental disability, when the term retard is being used in its pejorative form, it is usually not being directed at people with mental disabilities. Instead, people use the term when teasing their friends or as a general insult.

Legislation in the United States
Despite not typically being used in official context, "mental retardation" was still written in many of the United States' laws and documents until October 5, 2010, when U.S. President Barack Obama signed into effect S. 2781, also known as Rosa's Law. The bill changed references in federal law; the term mental retardation was replaced by mental disability. Additionally, the phrase "mentally retarded individual" was replaced with "an individual with an intellectual disability". Rosa's Law was named after Rosa Marcellino, a nine-year-old girl with Down syndrome. She worked with her parents to have the words "mentally retarded" officially removed from health and education code in Maryland, her home state.  With this new law, "mental retardation" and "mentally retarded" no longer exist in federal health or education and labor policy. The rights of individuals with disabilities would remain the same. The goal of this change in phrasing was to remove language that may be considered derogatory to communities.

See also 
 Spread the Word
 List of disability-related terms with negative connotations

References 

Slurs related to low intelligence
1990s slang
2000s slang
2010s slang
2020s slang
Obsolete terms for mental disorders
Pejorative terms for people with disabilities